The Two Swords is a fantasy novel by American writer  R. A. Salvatore, the third and final book in his series The Hunter's Blades Trilogy. The Two Swords was his 17th work concerning one of the most famous characters Salvatore has created, the drow, or dark elf, Drizzt Do'Urden. It follows The Thousand Orcs and The Lone Drow.

Plot summary
In The Two Swords, Obould's horde has pressed the Companions to the very gates of Mithral Hall, where Bruenor and his clan launch a desperate, last-ditch effort to push the orcs back.  A desperate rescue attempt succeeds, with Drizzt and Innovindil rescuing the latter's pegasus, which Obould had captured and chained as a trophy, and Drizzt is unexpectedly reunited with the Companions that he long thought dead. The only major plot line to be tied up in this novel is the question of what Drizzt will do about his relationship with Catti-brie.

Other than that, The Two Swords resolves a few minor plot threads. Drizzt and the surface elf Innovindil bring their quest for the captured pegasus to a conclusion. A few more characters meet their demise in this novel.  Ultimately, the novel keeps the major plot lines active for future novels, and introduces several more.

Reception
The Two Swords reached No. 5 on The Washington Posts bestseller list for the week ending October 24, 2004. It debuted on The New York Times bestseller list at No. 4 and at No. 1 on The Wall Street Journal Bestseller List in early November.  Patrick Bergeron II from fantasybookspot.com found The Two Swords predictable and expected key sequences such as the character Drizzt "finding out that his friends had not fallen at Shallows". However he still enjoyed the story and characterization.

The Two Swords peaked at #4 on the New York Times Best Seller list in 2004. It reached the top of The Wall Street Journal'''s hardcover bestseller list after only two weeks, a record for its publisher Wizards of the Coast. It also debuted at #4 on The New York Times's bestseller list, and #2 on Publishers Weekly bestseller list.

ReviewChronicle''

References

2004 American novels
Forgotten Realms novels
Novels by R. A. Salvatore